ICGA may refer to:

 Indian Coast Guard Academy
 Imperial Continental Gas Association
 Indocyanine green angiography